St John's Wood Road Baptist Church is an evangelical Baptist church in St John's Wood, London. The church is situated between Lord's Cricket Ground and Maida Vale.

History 

St. John’s Wood Road Baptist Church began meeting in the mid-1820s. It was started by a group of 30 or so Christians, and in its first 50 years grew to over 400 members. In the early 1900s the church moved to the site it now occupies, and began meeting in the present building in 1987. In the first part of the 1900s the church was very active in missionary endeavour, sending missionaries to India in particular. However, from the Second World War the number of people meeting together in the church declined as was the case at the time in many other churches in London.

Present day 

Today, the church is a small congregation of just over 50 people who attend the Sunday morning meeting each week.
There are also mid-week Bible study groups.

See also
List of churches in London

References

External links
The Church's website
How to find the church
The Church's Facebook page

Churches in the City of Westminster
St John's Wood